Countryside High School, also known as CHS, is a public high school located in Clearwater, Florida. Established in 1980, it is a part of the Pinellas County Schools system, and is one of the larger schools in Pinellas County.  It draws students from Dunedin, suburban east Clearwater, Safety Harbor, and Oldsmar.

Countryside High School is one of the largest and most prestigious schools in the Pinellas County School system.

History
The school's first graduating class in 1980 finished before the school was completed and held classes and graduation at Dunedin High School.

Countryside High School's Battle of the Books Team took First Place in the Battle of the Books for three years running, beginning in 2010.

In 2022 a resurfaced outside facade and a new mall floor design were built.

Academics
The school offers numerous advanced academic programs and recognition, including foreign languages and technology honor societies along with ISTEM (institute of science, technology, engineering and mathematics), and CCT (Center for Computer Technologies). The Winter guard is the Scholastic Class A Florida Federation of Color guard Circuit (FFCC) state champions and the scholastic class A Winter Guard International bronze medalists in 2006.

The school won the first high school "Battle of the Books" competition in 2006, repeating the feat again in 2007, 2008, 2011, 2012, 2013, 2015.

The school newspaper, Paw Print, has received an All Florida Rating from the Florida Scholastic Press Association; a Superior from the Southern Interscholastic Press Association and an International Second Place Award from Quill and Scroll.

The UPC Morning Show (Upper Pinellas County) televised newscast began in 1987, and has since grown to an award-winning, student-produced daily 8-minute news show. Both the Paw Print newspaper and the UPC Morning Show can be seen online.

Student life

Clubs
CHS offers a variety of clubs (over 25) for student development involvement.

Theater
Countryside has a notable Drama program winning many statewide awards. It has consistently been one of the highest performing schools in Florida.

In 2007–2008, the  musical Honk, an adaptation of the Ugly Duckling, was selected to be performed as a Mainstage show at the Florida State Thespian Festival on May 1, 2008. It was one of six chosen from a group of 35 shows in Florida. Other shows done by CHS include Li'l Abner. The Foreigner, West Side Story, and Steel Magnolias.

In 2011–2012, their production of Return to the Forbidden Planet was also selected to be performed as a Mainstage show.

In 2015–2016, their one act A... My Name Is Alice received a superior rating and was selected to represent their district and perform at the Florida State Thespian Festival

In the 2021-2022 school year, they received great notoriety for their productions of Puffs and Head Over Heels, which were nominated for, and won many awards from The Straz Center's Broadway Star of The Future Program.  

Thespian Troupe 900 is responsible for many outdoor performances among the combined rock band, choir, and musical theater groups on campus.

Sports

Countryside won the 1985 4A FHSAA State Meet.
Countryside won the 2006 State Championship for class 6A boys soccer.

The school offers many sports for boys and girls, including football, basketball, track, and many others.

Marching band

 2006 Placed 4th in the Class 3A Florida Marching Band Coalition's State Championships at Tropicana Field, St. Petersburg, Florida.
 2006 Cotton Bowl Classic field show Grand Champions and 1st runner-up in the parade competition for the 2006 Cotton Bowl Classic in Dallas, Texas. Performed with the mass band performance at Pre-Game and Halftime.
 2009 Invited to play at the 2009 Super Bowl in Tampa, Florida where they performed at the NFL Experience Fan Fest for the presentation of the Lombardi Trophy.
 2009 Field show Grand Champions at the Chick-Fil-A Bowl.  Performed with the mass band for Pre-Game and Halftime.  
 2010 Placed 4th and received the Best Visual Performance in the Class 1A Florida Marching Band Coalition's State Championships at Tropicana Field, St. Petersburg, Florida.

Notable alumni

Bobby Finke, 2x Olympic Gold Medalist in swimming
David Blue, actor
Keith Boykin, author and broadcaster
Vic Carrapazza, Major League Baseball umpire
Andrew DeClercq, 1991 graduate, who played in the National Basketball Association for Golden State Warriors, Boston Celtics, Cleveland Cavaliers, and Orlando Magic
Jared Frayer, 2012 Olympic freestyle wrestler
Matt Geiger, 1987 graduate, who played in the National Basketball Association for Miami Heat, Charlotte Hornets, and Philadelphia 76ers
Mike Gomes, musician/artist
Ira Heiden, actor who appeared in A Nightmare on Elm Street 3: Dream Warriors, Illegally Yours, and a small recurring role on the TV hit Alias
Agim Kaba, actor
Melanie Margalis, Olympic swimmer
Jeff Mitchell, played center for the Carolina Panthers and won a Super Bowl with the Baltimore Ravens
Tyler Moore, University of Florida offensive tackle
Stephanie Moulton Sarkis, psychotherapist and author
George Tsamis, former professional baseball player who pitched for the Minnesota Twins. He is currently manager of the St. Paul Saints, a professional independent minor league team from Minnesota.
Eliot Schrefer, author
Mike Love, Buffalo Bills DE

References

External links
School website
School Football Program website
Paw Print newspaper and UPC Morning Show television
CHS Drama Dept. Website
 CHS The Muse Literary & Art Magazine
 Band of Pride Website
Cougar U Program

Educational institutions established in 1981
High schools in Pinellas County, Florida
Public high schools in Florida
1981 establishments in Florida